Riviera Apartments is a historic apartment building located at Baltimore, Maryland, United States. It is a six-story, brick and cast stone apartment building built in 1915.

Riviera Apartments was listed on the National Register of Historic Places in 1999.

References

External links
, including photo from 1998, at Maryland Historical Trust

Buildings and structures in Baltimore
Apartment buildings in Baltimore
Residential buildings on the National Register of Historic Places in Baltimore
Residential buildings completed in 1915
Reservoir Hill, Baltimore
1915 establishments in Maryland